Already Here is the fourth album by Native American/Mexican American band Redbone.

Track listing

Side one
"Fais-Do" (P. Vegas/L. Vegas) – 2:36
"Motivation" (L. Vegas/T. Bellamy/P. Vegas) – 2:13
"Power (Prelude To A Means)" (P. Vegas) – 4:29
"Speakeasy" (L. Vegas) – 3:50
"Condition Your Condition" (L. Vegas/T. Bellamy/P. Vegas) - 2:51

Side two
"Where Is Your Heart" (L. Vegas) – 3:05
"Good Enough For Jesus" (P. Vegas) – 2:36
"Poison Ivy" (Jerry Leiber, Mike Stoller) – 3:00
"Already Here (Brujo)" (L. Vegas) – 9:21

Personnel
 Lolly Vegas – lead guitar, vocals
 Tony Bellamy – rhythm guitar, vocals
 Pat Vegas – bass, vocals
 Arturo Perez – drums, percussion

Additional personnel
 Peter DePoe - drums
 Red Rhodes - steel guitar
 Terry Furlong - slide guitar
 Gordon DeWitty - piano
 Elijah horn section - brass
 Chipper Lavergne - percussion
 Ronnie Baron - percussion
 David Oliver - background vocals
 Michael Freda - background vocals

References

1972 albums
Redbone (band) albums
Epic Records albums